Biblioteka Nauki is a Polish digital library containing in its database full texts of articles published in Polish scientific journals and full texts of selected scientific books.

Przypisy 

Polish digital libraries